Zittel Cliffs is a set of cliffs rising to about 1,400 m in the northwest part of Du Toit Nunataks, Read Mountains, Shackleton Range. The feature was surveyed by the Commonwealth Trans-Antarctic Expedition, 1957, photographed from the air by the U.S. Navy, 1967, and further surveyed by British Antarctic Survey (BAS), 1968–71. In association with the names of geologists grouped in this area, named by United Kingdom Antarctic Place-Names Committee (UK-APC) in 1971 after Karl Alfred von Zittel (1839-1904), German paleontologist who specialized in the study of fossil sponges.

Cliffs of Coats Land
Cliffs of Antarctica